An omnibus clause is a clause that provides or includes all residuary not specifically mentioned.

In automobile liability insurance an omnibus clause may provide coverage for the named insured, any member of the insured's household, and any person using the automobile with the insured's permission, provided the use was within the permitted scope.

In a will an omnibus clause can distribute to a named beneficiary all unnamed assets included in the decedent's estate.

Contract clauses

References
 Protection
 eVB Nummern (in German)